Victoria Alexandrovna Sinitsina (born 29 April 1995) is a Russian ice dancer. With Nikita Katsalapov, she is the 2022 Olympic champion in the team event, 2022 Olympic silver medalist, 2021 World champion, two-time European Champion (2020,2022), the 2019 World silver medalist, the 2018–19 Grand Prix Final silver medalist, and a two-time Russian national champion (2019–2020). They have also won several medals on the Grand Prix and the Challenger Series, including winning the 2018 CS Ondrej Nepela Trophy.

With former partner Ruslan Zhiganshin, she is the 2012 World Junior champion and won bronze medals at the 2013 Winter Universiade, 2012 Rostelecom Cup, and 2014 Russian Championships.

Personal life 
Sinitsina was born on 29 April 1995 in Moscow. Her father, Alexander Sinitsin, and aunt, Tatiana Sinitsina, are former gymnasts.

On 22 May 2022, ice dancing partner Nikita Katsalapov proposed to Sinitsina. 2 October 2022 Sinitsina and Katsalapov officially became husband and wife.

Early years on the ice 
Often having tonsillitis as a child, Sinitsina was introduced to skating by her parents to improve her health. She took up ice dancing at age 10 and had one partner before Zhiganshin.

Partnership with Zhiganshin 
Sinitsina and Ruslan Zhiganshin met in a group led by Irina Lobacheva and Ilia Averbukh but soon joined Elena Kustarova and Svetlana Alexeeva. They trained mostly in Moscow. From 2010 to 2012, they also went to summer training camps in Ventspils, Latvia.

Junior 
Sinitsina/Zhiganshin debuted on the Junior Grand Prix circuit at the 2008 Merano Cup where they finished sixth. The following JGP season, they placed fifth at both of their events.

They won a pair of silver medals during the 2010–11 JGP season and qualified for the JGP Final. At the Final, they won the short dance and placed second in the free dance to take the silver behind Monko/Khaliavin. They withdrew from the 2011 Russian Junior Championships due to Sinitsina's illness.

In the 2011–12 season, Sinitsina/Zhiganshin won gold at the Junior Grand Prix event in Poland, their first JGP title. They won another title in Austria to qualify for their second JGP Final. At the Junior Grand Prix Final, they placed first in both segments and won the title. They then took gold at the 2012 Russian Junior Championships. Sinitsina/Zhiganshin won the 2012 World Junior title. They were first in both the short and free dance and scored their season's best, 153.81 points.

Senior 
In the 2012–13 season, Sinitsina/Zhiganshin debuted on the senior Grand Prix series. After finishing sixth at the 2012 Cup of China, they then won their first senior Grand Prix medal, bronze, at the 2012 Rostelecom Cup. The duo finished 5th in their senior national debut at the 2013 Russian Championships.

In 2013–14, Sinitsina/Zhiganshin started their season at the Ice Star in Minsk, Belarus, winning the silver medal behind Bobrova/Soloviev. At their sole Grand Prix assignment, the 2013 NHK Trophy, they had a bad fall while practicing a lift. They finished eighth at the event. After taking the bronze medal at the 2013 Winter Universiade in Trentino, Italy, they stepped onto the senior national podium for the first time at the 2014 Russian Championships. Competing against Riazanova/Tkachenko for Russia's third Olympic spot, Sinitsina/Zhiganshin finished ahead at nationals and then at the 2014 European Championships in Budapest. They came in fourth at the latter event, their senior ISU Championship debut.

Along with Ilinykh/Katsalapov and Bobrova/Soloviev, Sinitsina/Zhiganshin were selected to represent Russia at the Winter Olympics, held in February 2014 in Sochi. They finished sixteenth at the Olympics, behind a number of teams they had surpassed at Europeans, but rebounded the next month at the 2014 World Championships. They placed eighth in both segments and finished seventh overall in Saitama, Japan. Sinitsina ended their partnership after Worlds.

Partnership with Katsalapov 
On 11 April 2014, Sinitsina and Nikita Katsalapov applied for approval of their partnership from the Figure Skating Federation of Russia (FSFR). They then traveled to Michigan to train for three weeks under Marina Zueva.

2014–15 season 
Sinitsina/Katsalapov made their competitive debut at the 2014 Rostelecom Cup, a Grand Prix event in Moscow; they placed fourth in both segments and finished well behind their former partners. At the 2014 NHK Trophy, they finished fifth in the short dance, eighth in the free dance after falling on one lift and aborting another, and eighth overall. They were fourth at the 2015 Russian Championships.

2015–16 season 
A stress fracture in his foot that kept Katsalapov off the ice in early 2015 recurred in the summer of 2015, keeping the duo out of test skates organized by the FSFR. Competing in the 2015–16 Grand Prix series, Sinitsina/Katsalapov won the silver medal at the 2015 Skate America, obtaining the highest total technical elements score in the free dance, and then bronze at the 2015 Rostelecom Cup, behind Italians Cappellini/Lanotte. They were the second highest-ranked Russian couple in the Grand Prix rankings, behind Ekaterina Bobrova and Dmitri Soloviev who also won one silver and one bronze but had a higher total short dance score, and were the first alternates for the 2015–16 Grand Prix Final. In December, Sinitsina/Katsalapov won the silver medal behind Bobrova/Soloviev at the 2016 Russian Championships in Yekaterinburg.

In January, Sinitsina/Katsalapov finished fourth behind Bobrova/Soloviev at the 2016 European Championships in Bratislava, Slovakia. They placed ninth at the 2016 World Championships in Boston.

Two days after the World Championships, Katsalapov received a surgery on his right shoulder.

2016–17 season 
In mid-2016, Sinitsina/Katsalapov returned to Russia to train and continue rehabilitation of his shoulder in Moscow. Oleg Volkov was named as their coach and Elena Tchaikovskaya was added later to their coaching team.

At their Grand Prix events they first placed fourth at the 2016 Cup of China and then fifth at the 2016 NHK Trophy. At the 2017 Russian Championships they won the bronze medal but finished only tenth at the 2017 European Championships.

2017–18 season 
Sinitsina/Katsalapov were scheduled for the later Grand Prix events NHK Trophy and Skate America in November. Before their Grand Prix events they skated one Challenger event, the 2017 CS Minsk-Arena Ice Star, where they won the bronze medal. At their Grand Prix events they first placed fourth at the 2017 NHK Trophy and then they won the bronze medal at the 2017 Skate America. At the 2018 Russian Championships they had to withdraw after the short dance.

2018–19 season 

Sinitsina/Katsalapov started their season at the 2018 CS Ondrej Nepela Trophy where they won the gold medal with a personal best score of 196.42 points. In late October they won the silver medal at the 2018 Skate Canada. In late November they won their second Grand Prix silver medal of the season at the 2018 Internationaux de France. At this event they also scored their personal best score of 200.38 points. With two Grand Prix silver medals they qualified for the 2018–19 Grand Prix Final. At the Grand Prix Final, Sinitsina/Katsalapov won the silver medal after placing third in the rhythm dance and second in the free dance. At this event they also scored their personal best score of 201.37 points.

At the 2019 Russian Championships, Sinitsina/Katsalapov placed first in both the rhythm and free dances, taking the Russian national title for the first time in their careers.

Sinitsina/Katsalapov were medal favourites going into the 2019 European Championships, but encountered issues in the rhythm dance when first Katsalapov and then Sinitsina fell during their twizzle sequence.  They placed fifth in the rhythm dance, almost nine points behind the third-place team, and effectively out of medal contention.  Katsalapov was uncertain as to the cause, saying "I don’t know exactly what happened. I can’t excuse it or justify it."  They placed third in the free dance, winning a bronze small medal, with Katsalapov saying that they "fought hard to show the beautiful choreography of our program and avoid any stupid mistakes."

At the 2019 World Championships, Sinitsina/Katsalapov placed second in both segments, winning the silver medal, their first World medal.She commented that it was "five years we started to skate together, and we know each other really well. The cooperation in our team comes from our ties and the group of coaches who help us a lot."  Subsequently, they were assigned to the 2019 World Team Trophy, finishing second in both dance segments, and winning the bronze medal as part of Team Russia.

2019–20 season 

Sinitsina/Katsalapov started their season at the 2019 CS Ondrej Nepela Memorial, where they won the gold medal.  On the Grand Prix, they began at the 2019 Cup of China, where they placed first in the rhythm dance with a new personal best score.  The finished second in the free dance, behind Madison Chock/Evan Bates, but their rhythm dance lead was sufficient to give them the gold medal. Katsalapov said they were "not pleased with our performance today", and hoped that they would show improvement the following week.  At the 2019 Rostelecom Cup, they won the gold medal.  Katsalapov said they looked forward to showing their "very best" at the Grand Prix Final.  Competing at the Final, they unexpectedly placed fourth in the rhythm dance after a number of technical issues, leading him to comment "I made a mistake on the twizzles and realized that level would be definitely reduced. But looking at the points and levels, it seems that everything was bad."  In the free dance, they came sixth out of the six teams after losing levels on a number of elements and Sinitsina having a technical fall in their choreographic sliding movement, and dropped to sixth overall.

Competing at the 2020 Russian Championships, Sinitsina/Katsalapov placed first in the rhythm dance despite a slight loss of balance by Katsalapov in his twizzle sequence.  Second in the free dance, they nevertheless won their second national title.

In what would prove to be their final competition of the season, Sinitsina/Katsalapov competed at the 2020 European Championships in Graz.  After the rhythm dance, they were in second place, separated from five-time defending champions Papadakis/Cizeron by only 0.05 points.  In a close result, they won the free dance and took the title overall by a margin of 0.14 points.  This marked the first time anyone had beaten Papadakis/Cizeron since Virtue/Moir at the 2018 Winter Olympics, and the first time they had been defeated in the free dance since the 2016–17 Grand Prix Final.  The result was considered a major upset, with Katsalapov remarking "to get anywhere near Gabriella and Guillaume seemed impossible for all the skaters."

The European result generated immediate speculation that Sinitsina/Katsalapov could challenge Papadakis/Cizeron for the World gold at the 2020 World Championships in Montreal, but these were cancelled as a result of the coronavirus pandemic.

2020–21 season 
Due to Katsalapov recovering from an injury, the team missed the 2020 Russian senior test skates.  Sinitsina/Katsalapov thus began the season at the second stage of the domestic Russia Cup, but had to withdraw midway through the free dance after Sinitsina suffered severe tendon inflammation.

Following recovery, the duo had their first full competition at the 2020 Rostelecom Cup, placing first in the rhythm dance by a wide margin.  They struggled toward the end of their free dance, which Sinitsina said was their "first full run-through", but remained comfortably first in both the segment and overall.  They subsequently withdrew from the fifth stage of the Russian Cup and the 2021 Russian Championships due to medical issues.  Katsalapov subsequently indicated that both had contracted COVID-19, with his being a mild case while hers was "severe" and damaged her lungs.  The two were announced as performing in a New Year's skating show to help regain competitive form.

Following a victory at the Russian Cup Final, Sinitsina/Katsalapov were assigned to the 2021 World Championships, to be held without an audience in Stockholm. Four-time and defending champions Papadakis/Cizeron declined to attend due to their own illness with COVID and lack of training time, leading to much speculation that Sinitsina/Katsalapov were the frontrunners to claim the World title. They won both the rhythm and free dances to take the gold medal, setting personal bests for the free dance and total score. Their placement combined with the fifth-place finish of Stepanova/Bukin qualified three berths for Russian ice dance at the 2022 Winter Olympic Games in Beijing.

Sinitsina/Katsalapov finished the season at the 2021 World Team Trophy, where they finished first in both of their segments and Team Russia won the gold medal.

2021–22 season 
After debuting their programs at the Russian senior test skates, Sinitsina/Katsalapov withdrew from a planned appearance on the domestic Russian Cup series due to Katsalapov suffering a back injury.

Making their season debut on the Grand Prix at the 2021 NHK Trophy, Sinitsina/Katsalapov won the gold medal. Speaking after the free dance, Katsalapov credited the crowd for it support, and said that "we want to improve further, but for now we are happy. Our program is about us, our career and hopefully with a bright finish." They won a second gold at the 2021 Rostelecom Cup. The results qualified them for the Grand Prix Final, to be held in Osaka, but it was subsequently cancelled due to restrictions prompted by the Omicron variant.

Seeking to win their third national title at the 2022 Russian Championships, Sinitsina/Katsalapov won the rhythm dance. However, they then had to withdraw from the event due to an exacerbation of Katsalapov's back injury. Despite this, they were named to the Russian team for the 2022 European Championships. Sinitsina/Katsalapov won both segments of the competition to successfully defend their European title. On January 20, they were officially named to the Russian Olympic team.

Sinitsina/Katsalapov began the 2022 Winter Olympics as the Russian entries in the rhythm dance segment of the Olympic team event. They unexpectedly placed second in the segment, behind Americans Hubbell/Donohue, after Katsalapov lost a twizzle level and visibly stumbled at one point. Skating the free dance segment as well, they finished second behind Americans Chock/Bates due to an extended lift deduction, but nevertheless won the gold medal as part of Team Russia. In the dance event, Sinitsina/Katsalapov came second in the rhythm dance with 88.85, 1.98 points behind Papadakis/Cizeron's world record score. Second in the free dance as well, they won the silver medal, Sinitsina's second Olympic medal and Katsalapov's fourth.

Days after the Olympics, Russian president Vladimir Putin ordered a full-scale invasion of Ukraine. In response to this, the International Skating Union banned all Russian and Belarusian athletes from competing at the 2022 World Championships, bringing an end to Sinitsina and Katsalapov's international season.

Support of Russia's invasion of Ukraine
On 18 March 2022, Sinitsina and Katsalapov appeared at Putin's Moscow rally celebrating the annexation of Crimea from Ukraine in 2014 and justifying the invasion of Ukraine. They both wore the Z military symbol used by the Russian invading army in Ukraine. Sinitsina and Katsalapov's presence at the rally was criticized by their former training partners, Ukrainian ice dancers Oleksandra Nazarova and Maksym Nikitin, who spent weeks caught in the siege of Kharkiv. Nikitin said "we were such big friends with Vika and Nikita. It was so difficult to see how they are supporting their President who is killing our Ukrainian people."

In December 2022, the Ukrainian Parliament sanctioned Sinitsina and Katsalapov for their support of the war.

Programs

With Katsalapov

With Zhiganshin

Records and achievements 
(with Katsalapov)

 Set the ice dancing record of the new +5 / -5 GOE (Grade of Execution) system for the free dance (120.46 points) at the 2018 CS Ondrej Nepela Trophy.
 They became the first team to score above 120 points in the free dance at the 2018 CS Ondrej Nepela Trophy.
 Became the first ice dance team to win the World Championship and the World Team Trophy in the same year.

Competitive highlights 
GP: Grand Prix; CS: Challenger Series; JGP: Junior Grand Prix

With Katsalapov

With Zhiganshin

Detailed results 
Small medals for short and free programs awarded only at ISU Championships. At team events, medals awarded for team results only. ISU personal bests highlighted in bold.

With Katsalapov

With Zhiganshin

References

External links 

 
 
 
 

Russian female ice dancers
1995 births
Living people
Russian nationalists
Sports controversies
Figure skaters from Moscow
World Figure Skating Championships medalists
World Junior Figure Skating Championships medalists
Figure skaters at the 2014 Winter Olympics
Figure skaters at the 2022 Winter Olympics
Olympic figure skaters of Russia
Universiade medalists in figure skating
Universiade bronze medalists for Russia
Competitors at the 2013 Winter Universiade
European Figure Skating Championships medalists
Medalists at the 2022 Winter Olympics
Olympic medalists in figure skating
Olympic gold medalists for the Russian Olympic Committee athletes
Olympic silver medalists for the Russian Olympic Committee athletes